Mikes Creek is a stream in Barry and McDonald counties of the Ozarks of southwestern Missouri.

The source of the stream is in western Barry County to the southeast of Rocky Comfort in northeast McDonald County. The stream flows southwest paralleling Missouri Route U then turns west to its confluence just northwest of Powell.
 
Some say Mike's Creek was named after an elderly settler named Mike, while others believe the name is a corruption of Michael, the surname of Phillip Michael, a pioneer citizen.

See also
List of rivers of Missouri

References

Rivers of Barry County, Missouri
Rivers of McDonald County, Missouri
Rivers of Missouri